Edwin Reuben Hawkins (August 19, 1943 – January 15, 2018) was an American gospel musician, pianist, choir master, composer, and arranger. He was one of the originators of the urban contemporary gospel sound. He (as leader of the Edwin Hawkins Singers) was probably best known for his arrangement of "Oh Happy Day" (1968–69), which was included on the "Songs of the Century" list.  The Edwin Hawkins Singers made a second foray into the charts exactly one year later, backing folk singer Melanie on "Lay Down (Candles in the Rain)".

Biography
Hawkins was born in Oakland, California, on August 19, 1943. At the age of seven, he was already the keyboardist to accompany the family's gospel group.

Together with Betty Watson in May 1967, he was co-founder of the Northern California State Youth Choir of the Church of God in Christ (COGIC), which included almost fifty members. This ensemble recorded its first album, Let Us Go into the House of the Lord, at the Ephesian Church of God in Christ in Berkeley, California (on the Century 70 custom label owned by LaMont Branch). The choir used this LP as a fundraiser to go to the 1968 Youth Congress for the COGIC in Washington, D.C. to compete in the annual choir competition and represent the Northern California area. The choir did come in second place at the competition, but that was one of many surprises coming their way. Upon their return from that trip, the LP found its way into the hands of a KSAN Underground Rock DJ in San Francisco who happened to pick "Oh Happy Day" to play on his station; it became an instant hit. The soloists on the album were Elaine Kelly, Margarette Branch, Dorothy Combs Morrison (the original lead singer on "Oh Happy Day"), Tramaine Davis (Hawkins), Reuben Franklin, Donald Cashmere, Betty Watson, and Ruth Lyons.

Once "Oh Happy Day" started being played in other parts of the country and the group was made aware of its rising success on the radio, they began to get in contact with the right people in the industry who helped them get a major record deal. The group signed on with the newly created Pavilion label (distributed by Buddah), and released a second LP, called He's A Friend Of Mine, in 1969, but it was "Oh Happy Day" that rocketed to sales of more than a million copies within two months.  It crossed over to the pop charts, making U.S. No. 4, UK No. 2, Canada No. 2, No. 2 on the Irish Singles Chart, and No. 1 on the French Singles Charts and the German Singles Charts in 1969.  It then became an international success, selling more than 7 million copies worldwide, and Hawkins was awarded his first Grammy for it. His arrangement of the song was eventually covered by The Four Seasons on their 1970 album Half & Half.

The choir's second LP Top 10 hit on the Billboard Hot 100 charts was the 1970 Melanie single "Lay Down (Candles in the Rain)," on which the label listed the performers as "Melanie with The Edwin Hawkins Singers". The song peaked at No. 6 in the U.S. and Top 10 in several other countries.

In 1990, Hawkins, credited as a solo performer, had a number 89 hit on the R&B chart with "If at First You Don't Succeed (Try Again)".

In the 1992 movie Leap of Faith, Hawkins is the choir master for the gospel songs.  

The Edwin Hawkins Singers performance of "Oh Happy Day" at the 1969 Harlem Cultural Festival appears in the 2021 music documentary, Summer of Soul.

Hawkins died of pancreatic cancer on January 15, 2018, in his home, in Pleasanton, California, at the age of 74.

Discography

Albums
1968: Let Us Go into the House of the Lord 
1969: He's A Friend Of Mine 
1969: Oh Happy Day (Buddah Records re-issue of previous 1968 LP)
1969: Jesus, Lover of My Soul 
1969: Hebrew Boys 
1969: Lord Don't Move That Mountain 
1969: Ain't It Like Him 
1970: Live at the Concertgebouw in Amsterdam 
1970: Candles in the Rain with Melanie Safka 
1970: Pray For Peace 
1970: More Happy Days 
1971: Try the Real Thing  
1969: Peace Is Blowin' In The Wind 
1971: Children Get Together 
1972: I'd Like To Teach the World To Sing 
1973: New World 
1976: Wonderful 
1977: The Comforter 
1977: Edwin Hawkins Presents the Matthews Sisters
1979: Edwin Hawkins Live at the Symphony   
1981: Edwin Hawkins Live with the Oakland Symphony Orchestra
1982: Imagine Heaven
1982: Edwin Hawkins Live with the Oakland Symphony Orchestra & The Love Center Choir Volume II 
1983: Edwin Hawkins presents The Music and Arts Seminar Mass Choir 
1984: Angels Will Be Singing with the Music and Arts Seminar Mass Choir 
1985: Have Mercy with the Music and Arts Seminar Mass Choir 
1987: Give Us Peace with the Music and Arts Seminar Mass Choir 
1988: People in Need with Tramaine Hawkins and the Edwin Hawkins Singers to benefit Homeless USA
1988: That Name with the Music and Arts Seminar Mass Choir 
1990: Face to Face 
1994: Kings and Kingdoms with the Music and Arts Seminar Mass Choir
1995: Anything is Possible
1998: Love Is the Only Way

Compilations
1989: 18 Great Songs 
1998: The Very Best Of

Awards and honors
Altogether Hawkins has won four Grammy Awards:
1970: Best Soul Gospel Performance – "Oh Happy Day", performed by the Edwin Hawkins Singers
1971: Best Soul Gospel Performance – "Every Man Wants to Be Free", performed by the Edwin Hawkins Singers
1977: Best Soul Gospel Performance, Contemporary – "Wonderful!"
1993: Best Gospel Choir or Chorus Album – choir director on Edwin Hawkins Music & Arts Seminar Mass Choir – Recorded Live in Los Angeles, performed by the Music & Arts Seminar Mass Choir

In 2007, Hawkins was inducted into the Christian Music Hall of Fame; he attended the formal awards show in 2009.

References

External links

Biography at gospel.it
 
 
  entry for the Edwin Hawkins Singers
  entry for the Edwin Hawkins Singers
  as Edwin Hawkins
  as The Edwin Hawkins Singers

1943 births
2018 deaths
Musicians from Oakland, California
American Pentecostals
Members of the Church of God in Christ
African-American songwriters
American gospel singers
American rhythm and blues musicians
Grammy Award winners
Singers from California
Songwriters from California
Deaths from pancreatic cancer
Deaths from cancer in California